Reddish North railway station is one of two stations serving the suburb of Reddish in Stockport, England; the other is Reddish South.

It was built by the Sheffield and Midland Railway Companies' Committee in 1875, on the line between New Mills Central and Manchester London Road (now Piccadilly station).

As a joint venture of the Manchester, Sheffield and Lincolnshire Railway and the Midland Railway, it was a shorter route than the earlier-built line through Hyde Junction. It was used by the Midland railway's main line expresses from London St Pancras until 1880, when they began running via Stockport Tiviot Dale into Manchester Central.

Originally named simply Reddish, it became Reddish North in 1951. Some of the original buildings have disappeared over time. The original station yard, with goods shed, is intact (though without rails) and is currently used by a timber merchant. Although the original mileposts along this section were maintained by the Great Central Railway, the mileages are measured from Rowsley on the Midland Railway line, contrary to the latter's normal practice of measuring from St Pancras.

Facilities
The station retains its ticket office, which is staffed on weekdays all day (06:30-21:00) and on Saturday until early afternoon (07:20-14:30).  Outside of these times, tickets must be bought in advance or on the train.  There is a waiting shelter on platform 2, along with bench seating.  Train running information is supplied via CIS screens, timetable posters and automated announcements.  Step-free access is only available on the Manchester-bound platform (1), as the only access to platform 2 is via a stepped footbridge.

See also
Reddish South railway station, the other station serving the town of Reddish.

Service
All services at Reddish North are operated by Northern Trains using Class 150 and Class 156 DMUs. 

The current off-peak service in trains per hour is:

On Sundays, there is a two-hourly service between Manchester Piccadilly and Sheffield.

References

External links

Railway stations in the Metropolitan Borough of Stockport
DfT Category E stations
Former Great Central and Midland Joint Railway stations
Railway stations in Great Britain opened in 1875
Northern franchise railway stations